My Four Years in Germany is a 1918 American silent war drama film that is notable as being the first film produced by the four Warner Brothers, Harry, Sam, Albert, and Jack, though the title card clearly reads "My Four Years In Germany Inc. Presents ...". It was directed by seasoned William Nigh, later a director at Metro-Goldwyn-Mayer, and was based on the experiences of real life U. S. Ambassador to Germany James W. Gerard as described in his book. The film was produced while World War I was still raging and is sometimes considered a propaganda film.

Cast
Halbert Brown as Ambassador James W. Gerard
Willard Dashiell as Sir Edward Goschen
Louis Dean as Kaiser Wilhelm II
Earl Schenck as Crown Prince of Germany
George Riddell as Field Marshall von Hindenburg
Frank Stone as Prince Henry of Prussia
Karl Dane as Chancellor von Bethmann-Hollweg
Fred Hern as Foreign Minister von Jagow
Percy Standing as Under-Secretary Zimmermann
William Bittner as Grand Admiral von Tirpitz
Arthur C. Duvel as Field Marshal von Falkenhayn
Ann Dearing as Aimee Delaporte
A. B. Conkwright as Socialist
William Nigh as Socialist

Reception
Like many American films of the time, My Four Years in Germany was subject to cuts by city and state film censorship boards. For example, the Chicago Board of Censors required cuts, in Reel 7, of the intertitle "Do you know where will be quarted tonight?", two scenes of officer entering cabin into which young woman runs and his exit, scene of young woman lying in bed with clothing disarranged after her criminal assault, scene of dead woman on ground, Reel 8, the intertitle "The first night we were quartered with the soldiers", and, Reel 10, scene of man drawing sword out of other man's body. The Chicago board's cuts totaled twenty feet of film.

Preservation
A copy of My Four Years in Germany is held in the Turner Entertainment film library.

References

External links

Full movie at Archive

1918 films
American silent feature films
American World War I propaganda films
American black-and-white films
American war drama films
Warner Bros. films
First National Pictures films
Cultural depictions of Wilhelm II
1910s war drama films
1918 drama films
Censored films
American World War I films
Films directed by William Nigh
1910s American films
Silent American drama films
Silent war drama films
1910s English-language films